Mark Noble (born 23 May 1963) is a British former cyclist. He competed in the team pursuit event at the 1984 Summer Olympics.

References

External links
 

1963 births
Living people
British male cyclists
Olympic cyclists of Great Britain
Cyclists at the 1984 Summer Olympics
Sportspeople from Hanover
Cyclists from Lower Saxony